A New Form of Beauty Parts 1-4 is a 1983 compilation album by Irish rock band Virgin Prunes. It collected parts 1 through 4 of the A New Form of Beauty project, which were issued by Rough Trade Records during 1981 and 1982.

History
A New Form of Beauty 1 (1981), issued as a 7" single, featured the songs "Sandpaper Lullaby" and "Sleep / Fantasy Dreams". It was followed by the 10" single A New Form of Beauty 2 (1981), which featured "Come to Daddy" and two other tracks. A New Form of Beauty 3 (1981) was a four-song 12" EP consisting of "Beast (Seven Bastard Suck)" on one side, and three tracks on the other side, subtitled "The Slow Children".

The final musical installment in the series, A New Form of Beauty 4 (1982), was a cassette release consisting of "Din Glorious", a mixture of previous A New Form of Beauty tracks and taped sounds recorded at the A New Form of Beauty 5 exhibition at the Douglas Hyde Gallery at Trinity College Dublin on 8 November 1981.

The project also included two additional pieces, the unpublished book A New Form of Beauty 6 and the unreleased film A New Form of Beauty 7.

In 1993, an abridged remastered version was issued by French label New Rose Records that omitted part 4 of the series. This abridged version was later issued in 2004 in the United States by Mute Records. That same year, The Grey Area reissued the complete version in the U.K.

Track listing

Personnel 

Virgin Prunes
 Dave-iD Busaras – vocals
 Mary D'Nellon – drums
 Dik Evans – guitar
 Gavin Friday – vocals
 Guggi – vocals
 Strongman – bass guitar

Technical personnel
 Virgin Prunes – production

Charts

Release history

References

External links 
 

1981 debut albums
Virgin Prunes albums
Rough Trade Records compilation albums